Ans van den Berg or Anna Carolina van den Berg (1873–1942) was a Dutch painter known for her still-lifes.

Biography
Berg was born in Amsterdam on 18 February 1873. She attended the Académie Colarossi in Paris. For over 30 years Berg shared a studio in Amsterdam with Jacoba Surie. Berg was a member of the Amsterdamse Joffers. Her portrait was painted by fellow artist Johanna Bauer-Stumpff which is in the collection of the  Rijksmuseum.

Van den Berg died on 6 October 1942 in Amsterdam.

References

External links

1873 births
1942 deaths
19th-century Dutch women artists
20th-century Dutch women artists
Painters from Amsterdam
Dutch women painters
Académie Colarossi alumni